Erich Graf von Bernstorff-Gyldensteen (26 June 1883 – 6 October 1968) was a German count and sport shooter who competed in the 1912 Summer Olympics.

He won the bronze medal in the clay pigeons team event. He also competed in the trap competition he finished 17th.

References

External links
profile

1883 births
1968 deaths
Counts of Germany
German male sport shooters
Shooters at the 1912 Summer Olympics
Olympic shooters of Germany
Olympic bronze medalists for Germany
Olympic medalists in shooting
Medalists at the 1912 Summer Olympics